TOLOnews is Afghanistan's first 24/7 news television channel, owned by MOBY Group, launched in August, 2010. Its sister channels are TOLO TV and Lemar TV in Afghanistan.

The channel is available on terrestrial across Afghanistan and satellite across the region. Its news bulletins are available on its website. Its main studio located in Kabul city.

Website
TOLOnews broadcasts in Persian Dari and Pashto and is available via the internet and social media in English, Dari and Pashto. Its website is www.tolonews.com.

See also 
 Television in Afghanistan
 Tolo TV
 Moby Media Group

References

External links
 
 
 
Live Streaming Link

Television in Afghanistan
Mass media in Afghanistan
Mass media in Kabul
Pashto-language websites